Christopher McDonald (born February 15, 1955) is an American film, television, theatre and voice actor. 

McDonald is best known for playing the villainous professional golfer Shooter McGavin in the 1996 comedy Happy Gilmore. Other notable starring roles for McDonald in film include "T-Birds" member Goose McKenzie in Grease 2 (1982), Darryl Dickinson opposite his former fiance Geena Davis in Thelma & Louise (1991), Ward Cleaver in the film adaptation  Leave It to Beaver (1997), and Tappy Tibbons in Requiem for a Dream (2000). Along with numerous independent and small-budget film roles, he played supporting characters in box-office hits Grumpy Old Men (1993), Flubber (1997), Rumor Has It (2005), The House Bunny (2008) and About Last Night (2014).

Voice acting roles for McDonald include Jor-El on Superman: The Animated Series (1996), Kent Mansley in The Iron Giant (1999), Superman on Batman Beyond (2000) and Harvey Dent on Beware the Batman (2014). On television, McDonald was a series regular on network TV shows Walter & Emily (1991-1992, NBC), Good Advice (1993-1994, CBS), Family Law (1999-2002, NBC), Cracking Up (2004, FOX) and Harry's Law, (2011-2012, NBC).

McDonald has portrayed several notable real-life people, including game show host Jack Barry in Quiz Show (1994), mountaineer Jon Krakauer in Into Thin Air: Death on Everest on ABC (1997), sportscaster Mel Allen in the HBO film 61* (2001), Yankee legend Joe DiMaggio in ESPN's The Bronx Is Burning (2007), U.S. Attorney General Harry M. Daugherty on HBO's Boardwalk Empire (2010-2012), Texas revolution soldier Henry Karnes in History Channel's Texas Rising (2015), and Clinton lawyer Robert S. Bennett on FX's Impeachment: American Crime Story (2021).

In 2022, McDonald was nominated for a Primetime Emmy Award for Outstanding Guest Actor in a Comedy Series for his role as casino CEO Marty Ghilain on the HBO Max show Hacks.

Personal life
McDonald was born in New York City, to Patricia, a nursing professor and real estate agent, and James R. McDonald, an educator and high school principal.

Of Irish descent and a practicing Catholic, he and his siblings were raised in Romulus, New York. He graduated from Romulus Central School in 1973 and later earned a degree from Hobart College in Geneva, New York  where he played football and soccer. He was also a member of the Kappa Alpha Society.  His younger brother, actor and singer Daniel McDonald, died of brain cancer in February 2007. He is a prominent fan of the Buffalo Bills and a friend of former Bills quarterback Jim Kelly.

McDonald was engaged to future Thelma and Louise co-star Geena Davis for a period in the mid-80s until 1985, when she left him for Jeff Goldblum.  McDonald met actress Lupe Gidley in 1989 when they performed together in a theatre production in New Mexico. They married in 1992 and have three daughters and one son.

Career
McDonald has numerous film and television roles, often as a supporting actor and often portraying villains. In addition to the above, his credits also include Grease 2, Breakin', Where the Boys Are '84, The Boys Next Door, Thelma & Louise, Grumpy Old Men, Celtic Pride, Quiz Show, Flubber, The Faculty, The Perfect Storm, House Arrest, Dirty Work, American Pie Presents: The Naked Mile, Broken Flowers, and Spy Kids 2: The Island of Lost Dreams. He was featured as Ward Cleaver in the movie version of Leave It to Beaver and famous baseball broadcaster Mel Allen in 61*. In 1994, he starred in the film Terminal Velocity as an aggressive Russian mafia villain.

In television, along with a starring role on the TV series Family Law, and recurring roles on North Shore, Veronica's Closet, Good Advice, and Harry's Law, McDonald has also made guest appearances on Matlock, Cheers, Riptide, Knight Rider, The Sopranos, Psych, both the 1985 and the 2002 versions of The Twilight Zone, Home Improvement, Las Vegas, the Law & Order franchise, Stargate Universe, and Star Trek: The Next Generation as Lt. Richard Castillo in the season three episode "Yesterday's Enterprise".

McDonald's voice work includes the determined government agent Kent Mansley in the animated film The Iron Giant. He also voiced Jor-El in Superman: The Animated Series and subsequently an older version of Superman in Batman Beyond. He has recalled great affection for these roles, saying that he enjoyed them because he was (and continues to be) such a fan of Superman and because they were in such contrast to the less than sympathetic onscreen roles for which he is known. He subbed for Burt Reynolds as Boss Hogg in The Dukes of Hazzard: The Beginning. In 2009, McDonald also lent his voice talents in the Thomas Nelson audio Bible production known as The Word of Promise. In this dramatized audio, McDonald played the role of Luke.

McDonald played the eponymous lead in Peter Gabriel's music video for the song "The Barry Williams Show". He also replaced Robert De Niro in the Midnight Run movie franchise, playing Jack Walsh in three films: Another Midnight Run, Midnight Runaround, and Midnight Run for Your Life. He portrayed baseball player Joe DiMaggio in the ESPN original series The Bronx Is Burning. In October 2013, McDonald started filming for A Conspiracy on Jekyll Island. Under the title The Crash, it was released direct-to-video in 2017.

McDonald appeared as Murphy in the Broadway show The Front Page at the Broadhurst Theater, which opened in late 2016.

In 2021, McDonald joined the cast of Hacks'' on HBO Max as Marty, a Las Vegas casino owner. In May 2021, McDonald was cast in the upcoming Disney+ series Secret Invasion, set in the Marvel Cinematic Universe. The show is set to premiere in 2023.

Filmography

Film

Television

References

External links

 
 

1955 births
Living people
American male film actors
American male television actors
American male voice actors
Catholics from New York (state)
Hobart and William Smith Colleges alumni
Hobart Statesmen football players
Male actors from New York City
People from Romulus, New York
20th-century American male actors
21st-century American male actors
American people of Irish descent